The Millionaire Matchmaker was an American reality television series on Bravo that premiered on January 22, 2008, and is hosted by Patti Stanger. The Millionaire Matchmaker follows Patti Stanger, owner of the Beverly Hills-based "Millionaire's Club" dating service, as she matches single wealthy people with closely compatible dates. The seventh season premiered on December 5, 2013, with an all-new panel of matchmakers.

In July 2015, Stanger announced that she had left the network after eight seasons and 90 episodes. It was later announced that she will be producing another show on WE tv. The new series, entitled Million Dollar Matchmaker, premiered on July 8, 2016.

Millionaire followed the "pioneering" matchmaking show Confessions of a Matchmaker.

Cast

 Patti Stanger (seasons 1–8), CEO of Millionaire's Club, former assistant to pioneering matchmaker, Janis Spindel
 Destin Pfaff (seasons 1–6), Executive assistant in the first season; promoted to chief operating officer in the second season
 Rachel Federoff (seasons 1–6), Office assistant in the seasons one to three; promoted to vice president of matching in the fourth season
 Chelsea Autumn (seasons 1–3), Vice president of matching
 Alison Standish (season 1), Club representative in sales
 Andreea Simmel (season 4), Intern
 Mara (seasons 5–6), Recruiter
 Justin Bird (season 7), Matchmaker
 Marisa Saks (season 7), Matchmaker
 David Cruz  (seasons 7–8), Matchmaker
 Candace Smith (season 8)

Timeline

Episodes

Series overview

Season 1 (2008)

Season 2 (2009)

Season 3 (2010)

Season 4 (2010-11)

Season 5 (2011)

Season 6 (2013)

Season 7 (2013–14)

Season 8 (2014–15)

References

External links
 
 [http://www.millionairesclub123.com Millionaire Matchmaker
 
 

2000s American reality television series
2008 American television series debuts
2015 American television series endings
2010s American reality television series
American dating and relationship reality television series
Bravo (American TV network) original programming
English-language television shows
Wealth in the United States